Pativilca is a town in central Peru, capital of the district Pativilca in the province Barranca in the region Lima.

References

External links
  Municipalidad Distrital de Pativilca

Populated places in the Lima Region